Koenraad Elst (born 7 August 1959) is a Flemish right wing Hindutva author, known primarily for his support of the Out of India theory and the Hindutva movement. Scholars have accused him of harboring Islamophobia.

Early life and education
Elst was born into a Flemish Catholic family but he rejects Roman Catholicism and instead calls himself a “secular humanist”. He graduated in Indology, Sinology and philosophy at the Catholic University of Leuven. Around that time, Elst became interested in Flemish nationalism. Between 1988 and 1992, Elst was at the Banaras Hindu University. In 1999, he received a PhD in Asian Studies from Leuven. His doctoral dissertation on Hindu revivalism was published as Decolonizing the Hindu Mind.

Prema Kurien notes Elst to be unique among the Voice of India scholars in the regard of his having an advanced academic degree in a related field of their professional discourse.

Works

Indigenous Aryan theories

In two books, Update on the Aryan Invasion Debate (1999) and Asterisk in Bhāropīyasthān (2007), Elst argues against the academically accepted view that the Indo-European languages originated in the Kurgan culture of the Central Asian steppes and that the migrations to Indian subcontinent in the second millennium BCE brought a proto-Indo-European language with them. He instead proposes that the language originated in India and it spread to Middle East and Europe when the Aryans, (who were indigenous) migrated out. According to Elst, the linguistic data are a soft type of evidence and are compatible with a variety of scenarios. The dominant linguistic theories may be compatible with an out-of-India scenario for Indo-European expansion.

One of the few authors to use paleolinguistics, he is deemed as one of the leading proponents of the Indigenous Aryans (Out of India fringe theory). The theory has been rejected by the scholarly community and is not deemed as a serious competitor to the Kurgan hypothesis, except by some authors in India.

Hindutva and Islamophobia
Elst was an editor of the New Right Flemish nationalist journal Teksten, Kommentaren en Studies from 1992 to 1995, focusing on criticism of Islam and had associations with Vlaams Blok, a Flemish nationalist far-right political party. He has also been a regular contributor to The Brussels Journal, a controversial conservative blog. 

In Ram Janmabhoomi vs Babri Masjid, Elst makes the case for the birthplace of Rama, the Hindu god/king to correspond with the site of Babri Masjid and concurrently portrays Islam as a fanatic bigoted faith. The book was published by Voice of India, a publication house that is self-describedly devoted to furthering the Hindu nationalist cause and had attracted immense criticism for publishing anti-Muslim literature in abundance. It was though praised by L. K. Advani, former deputy Prime Minister of India, who commanded an important role in the demolition of the said masjid. In Ayodhya and After (1991), Elst was even more explicit in the support of the demolition and termed it an exercise in national integration which provided "an invitation to the Muslim Indians to reintegrate themselves into the society and culture from which their ancestors were cut off by fanatical rulers and their thought police, the theologians". In another interview, Elst went on to claim that it was a justified act of revenge which enforced fears of Hindu repercussion, thus curtailing Muslim violence. He though has retrospectively rejected the use of violent force in the demolition of the temple and has urged the Muslims to contend with the construction of a peace monument.

An intellectual heir of the school of thought championed by Ram Swarup and Sita Ram Goel— the founders of the Voice of India, who were themselves highly critical of both Christianity and Islam—Elst is a prominent author of the house and adopts their hard-line stance against the two religions in his book. Elst argues that there existed an universal spirituality among all the races and faiths, prior to the introduction of "Semitic" faiths which corrupted it. In Decolonizing the Hindu Mind, he contends that the "need for 'reviving' Hinduism spring from the fact that the said hostile ideologies (mostly Islam) have managed to eliminate Hinduism physically in certain geographical parts and social segments of India, and also (mostly the Western ideologies) to neutralize the Hindu spirit among many nominal Hindus."

He is a vocal proponent of Hindutva, a Hindu nationalist movement which is typically associated with the far-right and supports the Bharatiya Janata Party. Elst perceives Hindutva as a tool to decolonize the mental and cultural state of Indians and return to the past days of Hindu glory. He has written in support of the view that the Vedic science was highly advanced and may be only understood by a Hindu mystic. The Saffron Swastika is widely regarded to be his magnum opus, which argues against the idea that the brand of Hindutva practiced by the Bharatiya Janata Party (BJP) / Rashtriya Swayamsevak Sangh are fascist in ideology. Advani had high regards for the work, terming Elst as a 'great historian' and even carried a "heavily marked" copy of the book from which he freely quoted the passages that discussed him.

In other essays and conferences, Elst has supported for outright attacks on the enemy ideology of Islam which, in his opinion, is supposedly inseparable with terrorism and hence, must be destructed. He calls for an Indian-ization of Muslims and Christians by forcing them to accept the supremacy of Hindu culture and terms it as the Final Solution for the Muslim Problem. In his 1992 book, Negationism in India: Concealing the Record of Islam, Elst attempts to demonstrate that there exists a prohibition of criticism of Islam in India and accuses secular historians (including the likes of Romila Thapar, Bipan Chandra, Ram Sharan Sharma et al.) of suffering from Hindu Cowardice wherein they ignore Muslim crimes against Hindu communities, in order to fulfill their Marxist agenda.

Reception
Elst has attracted significant criticism from the academia.

Anthropologist and noted commentator on politico-religious spheres Thomas Blom Hansen described Elst as a "Belgian Catholic of a radical anti-Muslim persuasion who tries to make himself useful as a 'fellow traveller' of the Hindu nationalist movement". Historian Sarvepalli Gopal deemed Elst to be "a Catholic practitioner of polemics" who was fairly oblivious of modern historiography methods. Meera Nanda deems him to be a far-right Hindu cum Flemish nationalist. Elst has engaged in historical revisionism and has been described variedly as a Hindu fundamentalist, pro-Hindutva right-wing ideologue, Hindutva apologist and Hindutva propagandist.

Meera Nanda has accused Elst of exploiting the writings of his intellectual forefathers over Voice of India, to "peddle the worst kind of Islamophobia imaginable".  Sanjay Subrahmanyam similarly deems Islamophobia as the common ground between Elst and the traditional Indian far right. Elst strongly denies the charges of him being an anti-Muslim, but insists that "not Muslims but Islam is the problem".

Elst's work has drawn praise from fellow Hindutva activists and conservatives. David Frawley deemed his work on Ayodhya as "definitive" and Paul Beliën had described him as "one of Belgium's best orientalists"; François Gautier considers Elst as one of the most knowledgeable scholars on India and regretted of his' being unable to publish except from Hindu-oriented publishing houses. Ramesh Nagaraj Rao praised Elst for his unassuming and brilliantly meticulous research whilst blaming the academia for turning him into an demonic figure, only to ignore his works.

Influences
Anders Behring Breivik, a Norwegian far-right terrorist, responsible for the 2011 Norway attacks extensively borrowed from his works, in writing his manifesto. The manifesto, among other things sought to deport all Muslims from Europe and quoted Elst in asserting the existence of a massive movement that was aimed to ''deny the large-scale and long-term crimes against humanity committed by Islam''.

Notes

References

External links 
 From Macaulay to Frawley, from Doniger to Elst: Why do many Indians need White saviours?

1959 births
Living people
People from Leuven
Belgian Indologists
Belgian political writers
Belgian columnists
Flemish writers
Islam and politics
Banaras Hindu University alumni
KU Leuven alumni
20th-century Belgian writers
21st-century Belgian writers
Writers about Hindu nationalism
Analysts of Ayodhya dispute
Indigenous Aryanists
Voice of India writers
Former Roman Catholics
Secular humanists
Hindutva